Genn is a surname. Notable people with the surname include:

 Antony Genn (born 1971), musician 
 Dave Genn (born 1969), musician
 Felix Genn (born 1950), German Roman Catholic bishop
 Hazel Genn (born 1949), lawyer
 James Genn (born 1972), filmmaker
 Leo Genn (1905–1978), actor
 Robert Genn (born 1936), artist